Langon is a commune in the Gironde department in Nouvelle-Aquitaine in southwestern France. Langon serves as the seat of its district, canton and subprefecture. Its inhabitants are called Langonnais.

Geography
It lies near the border between a wine-growing region (Premières côtes de Bordeaux) and the forest of Landes.

Population

Notable people born in Langon 
 Louis Beaulieu (1840–1866), catholic priest, martyr in Korea
 Thomas Boudat
 Caroline Delas
 Louis Ducos du Hauron
 Benjamin Fall
 Martine Faure
 Édouard Lafargue
 Pierre de La Montagne
 Pierre Lees-Melou
 Raymond Oliver
 Jean Sentuary
 Patrick Zygmanowski (born in 1970), classical pianist

Transport 
Traditionally it was a stop on the Bordeaux-Toulouse route; the city is now served by the Entre-Deux-Mers autoroute. (A62 Bordeaux-Toulouse).

Itinéraire à Grand Gabarit
Langon is also a pivotal point in the Itinéraire à Grand Gabarit, the waterway and road route constructed to allow the transportation of the fuselage sections and wings of the Airbus A380 airliner to the final assembly point in Toulouse. These components are brought to Langon by barge, where they are transferred at a specially constructed dock to outsize road vehicles. These then proceed in convoy via an indirect southerly route to Toulouse.

The crane used to unload the barges.

Rail
Langon station has rail connections (TER Nouvelle-Aquitaine) to Agen, Marmande and Bordeaux.

Bus

Buses at Langon are operated under the banner of the Nouvelle Aquitaine regional transport authority. Their website for buses in the area is https://transports.nouvelle-aquitaine.fr/cars-regionaux/reseau-et-horaires/gironde

Route / Line 501 connects Langon with Bordeaux along the D10 road, via Cadillac,Langoiran and Cambes, on the opposite bank of the river to the railway.

Routes 511 and 512 serve villages to the south and southeast.

Sights

 Château de Respide
 Château de Roquetaillade

See also
Communes of the Gironde department

References

Communes of Gironde
Gironde communes articles needing translation from French Wikipedia
Subprefectures in France